Matej Trojovsky (born October 12, 1984) is a Czech former professional ice hockey defenceman.  He played in the Czech Extraliga for HC Plzeň.  He was drafted 130th overall by the Carolina Hurricanes in the 2003 NHL Entry Draft.

Career statistics

External links
 
 Hokejový bitkař půjde do vězení, v podmínce se zapletl do hospodské rvačky

1984 births
Living people
Carolina Hurricanes draft picks
Czech expatriate ice hockey players in Canada
Czech expatriate ice hockey players in the United States
Czech ice hockey defencemen
HC Berounští Medvědi players
HC Plzeň players
Lincoln Stars players
Prince George Cougars players
Regina Pats players
Sportovní Klub Kadaň players
Swift Current Broncos players
Sportspeople from Plzeň